Deşdahat (also, Deshtagat, Deshtagat, Razvaliny, and Deyshtagat) is a village in the Qubadli Rayon of Azerbaijan.
Deşdahat is the Azeri and Kurdish village in Qubadli

References 

Populated places in Qubadli District